The 1942 Orange Bowl matched the Georgia Bulldogs and the TCU Horned Frogs.

Game summary
Frank Sinkwich was the highlight of the game in a Georgia beatdown of TCU. Sinkwich had three touchdown passes and one rushing touchdown for a combined total of 355 yards (rushing and passing), a record that stands to this day, overshadowing the game's 10 turnovers. Georgia had a 40-14 lead into the fourth quarter before TCU scored twice to narrow the lead, but Georgia ultimately won in the end, their first bowl win in their first bowl game.

Aftermath
82 years later, both TCU and Georgia would meet again in the National Championship game for the 2022 College Football season. The Bulldogs once again blew out TCU, this time by a much wider margin of 65-7.

References

Orange Bowl
Orange Bowl
Georgia Bulldogs football bowl games
TCU Horned Frogs football bowl games
Orange Bowl
January 1942 sports events